Cigaritis shaba is a butterfly in the family Lycaenidae. It is found in the Democratic Republic of the Congo (Shaba).

References

Butterflies described in 1991
Cigaritis
Endemic fauna of the Democratic Republic of the Congo